Happy New Year is a 1987 American crime comedy film directed by John G. Avildsen and starring Peter Falk. The screenplay was written by Warren Lane, based on the French film La bonne année. The director of the French film, Claude Lelouch, has a cameo as a man on a train.

Although the film had extremely limited success in the theaters, it became something of a cult film. It was nominated for an Academy Award in 1988 for Best Makeup, losing to Harry and the Hendersons. Bill Conti composed the score and produced a cover of the song "I Only Have Eyes for You" performed by The Temptations which was featured extensively throughout the film.

Plot
Nick and Charlie, a couple of aging thieves looking for a last score before they retire, come to ritzy Palm Beach, Florida, where they have an elaborate scheme to rob a Harry Winston jewelry store.

The shop is well guarded and has high-tech security. Its manager, Edward, welcomes an elderly customer seeking an expensive gift for a terminally ill wife. The eager-to-please Edward has no idea that this old gentleman is actually a middle-aged criminal, Nick, in disguise.

Dressed as himself, Nick encounters a sophisticated, attractive woman named Carolyn who owns an antique shop next to the jewelry store. He gets better acquainted with her while haggling over a Louis XVI table that she covets, and before long a romance begins to bloom.

An old woman drops by Harry Winston, also interested in making a purchase. She, too, is Nick in disguise. During these visits to the store, Nick is actually casing the joint, making mental notes of the security system in place, with help from Charlie, who is pretending to be a chauffeur.

On the night of the robbery, most but not all of Nick's preparations go well. He also didn't count on the participation of Carolyn, who could be convinced to begin a new life in South America with a new partner, as long as he doesn't end up behind bars.

Cast

Critical reception
Vincent Canby of The New York Times disliked the film, as he had the original, but had praise for the actors:

Gene Siskel, on the other hand, wrote in the Chicago Tribune on Aug. 22, 1987: "In 'Happy New Year' you will see one of Falk's finest comic performances, a clever caper, a pair of masterful masquerades and a sweet love story."

References

External links
 
 
 
 
 

1980s crime comedy films
1980s heist films
1987 films
American crime comedy films
American heist films
American remakes of French films
Columbia Pictures films
Films directed by John G. Avildsen
Films scored by Bill Conti
Films set in Florida
Films shot in Florida
1980s English-language films
1980s American films